Saawariya is a 2007 Indian Hindi-language romance film produced and directed by Sanjay Leela Bhansali, based on Fyodor Dostoevsky's 1848 short story White Nights. The film marked the debut of Ranbir Kapoor and Sonam Kapoor. It was the last film appearance of both Zohra Sehgal and Begum Para before their deaths. Co-produced by Sony Pictures Entertainment, it is the first Bollywood film to receive a North American release by a Hollywood studio and is one of the first Bollywood films to be released on Blu-ray Disc.

Saawariya released on 9 November 2007, and turned out to be a commercial disaster. It received mixed-to-negative reviews upon release, with praise for its soundtrack, production design, grand artistic approach and performances of the cast; however, its story and screenplay received sharp criticism.

At the 53rd Filmfare Awards, Saawariya received 6 nominations, including Best Supporting Actress (Mukherji) and Best Music Director (Monty Sharma), and won Best Male Debut (Ranbir Kapoor) and Best Male Playback Singer (Shaan for "Jab Se Tere Naina").

Plot
The story is narrated by Gulabji, a prostitute who frequents RK Bar, the town's most luxurious club. The bar's lead singer, Raj, whom she affectionately calls "Saawariya" ("beloved"), is a free-spirited and kindhearted man. Despite knowing what Gulab does, Raj is friendly to her, and unlike other men, is kind to the other prostitutes, trying to brighten their sad lives. When he tells Gulab that he needs a job and somewhere to stay, she tells him that there is only one woman who'll give him a place to stay: Lillian – but she allows only those she likes.

Raj meets Lillian and they have an emotional conversation, during which Lillian reveals she had a son who left her many years ago to join the army and never returned. She lets Raj stay with her because he reminds her of her long-lost son. That night, Raj meets a mysterious girl. He tries to talk to her, but under the wrong impression, she shouts at him to go away. Raj tells her that he will, on the condition that he would escort her to safety, lest someone with bad intentions trouble her. As predicted by Raj, a drunkard begins following her and Raj saves her from him. After that, she allows him to escort her home. Raj discovers her name is Sakina and falls in love with her.

Raj decides to confess his feelings to Sakina. He resigns from his job to meet her and calls her but she ignores him. He gets angry with her but the pair reconcile. He takes her to his favourite place, on the top of the clock tower. There, Sakina reveals that she is in love with a man named Imaan. Imaan had left but promised to return for Sakina on Eid. It has been a while but she is still waiting for him faithfully. Hearing this, Raj becomes heartbroken and does not confess. However, he refuses to believe that there is an Imaan. He asks Gulab for advice, who advises him to tell Sakina how he feels. With the entire neighbourhood cheering him on, Raj decides to propose to Sakina on the night of Eid.

He takes Sakina to RK Bar and sings his favourite song for her: "Saawariya". Sakina remembers that it is time to meet Imaan and leaves. Following her, Raj tells her that he has discovered that there is no Imaan. Sakina tells him to let her go. Hurt, Raj goes to Gulab, saying he wants to sleep with her. Gulab, who loves Raj, is deeply hurt and gets Raj thrown out onto the street, where he is beaten up by a few of Gulab's henchmen. He returns to where Sakina is waiting. Imaan has still not arrived. Sakina, heartbroken, becomes sure that Imaan will not come back so she decides to be with Raj. Raj tries to make Sakina happy and succeeds. When they are returning home, they pass the bridge where they first met and see Imaan waiting for Sakina. Sakina hesitates as she steps toward Raj. Raj, however, tells her to go and Sakina reunites with Imaan.

The movie ends as a tribute to Raj Kapoor, where Raj walks and sings in a style similar to Kapoor from the film Shree 420 (1955), remembering the sweet moments he spent with Sakina.

Cast
 Ranbir Kapoor as Ranbir Raj
 Sonam Kapoor as Sakina
Rani Mukherji as Gulabji
 Salman Khan as Imaan
Zohra Sehgal as Lillian a.k.a. Lillipop
Begum Para as Nabila/Badi Ammi
 Vibha Chibber as Naseeban
 Atheya Chaudhri as Jhumri Aapa
 Kenny Desai as Mr. D'Costa

Production
Bhansali initially wanted Rani Mukherji and Salman Khan's extended guest appearances to be hidden from the public, but later announced that they would be seen in supporting roles.

Elaborate sets for the film's imaginary city, complete with lakes, streets, shops, signages and a clock tower, were designed by the production designer Omung Kumar, who had previously worked with Bhansali on Black (2005).

The first official teaser of the film was accessed by New York Times on 25 August 2007. The first screening was held on 28 October 2007, though only for those associated with the film.

This film was released on 9 November 2007.

Soundtrack

The soundtrack for the film was released to mixed reviews on 19 September 2007. Indiafm gave the music three out of five stars, saying, "The title song would be remembered for months to come, if not years, the others do not really go that extra distance." According to the Indian trade website Box Office India, with around 10,00,000 units sold, the film's soundtrack album was the year's fourteenth highest-selling.

Reception
 

Shubhra Gupta of The Indian Express criticized the screenplay of the movie calling it "static", adding that "Saawariya is an act of supreme self-indulgence". Jaspreet Pandohar of BBC rated the movie 2 out of 5 writing, "It's a clear case of self indulgence and theatrical style over substance; with the director paying little attention to fleshing out the skeletal screenplay, preferring instead to focus on coaxing 'good-looking' performances from his young muses."

Accolades

Notes

References

Sony Pictures Networks India films

External links
 

2007 films
2000s Hindi-language films
Indian romantic musical films
Columbia Pictures films
Films directed by Sanjay Leela Bhansali
Films based on White Nights
Films shot in Maharashtra
Sony Pictures films
Films involved in plagiarism controversies